Insara is a genus known as "western bush katydids": characteristic of the tribe Insarini and placed in the family Tettigoniidae, subfamily Phaneropterinae. There are about 6 described species in Insara.

Species
 I. apache (Rehn, 1907) (Apache bush katydid)
 I. covilleae Rehn & Hebard, 1914 (creosote bush katydid)
 I. elegans (Scudder, 1901) (elegant bush katydid)
 I. gemmicula Rehn & Hebard, 1914 (gemmate bush katydid)
 I. juniperi Hebard, 1935 (juniper bush katydid)
 I. tessellata Hebard, 1935 (tessellate bush katydid)

References

 Capinera J.L, Scott R.D., Walker T.J. (2004). Field Guide to Grasshoppers, Katydids, and Crickets of the United States. Cornell University Press.
 Otte, Daniel (1997). "Tettigonioidea". Orthoptera Species File 7, 373.

Further reading

External links

 NCBI Taxonomy Browser, Insara

Phaneropterinae